William Andreas Brown (born September 7, 1930) served as the U.S. Ambassador to Thailand from 1985 to 1988 and U.S. Ambassador to Israel from 1988 to 1992. He also served as the last Chief of mission (Chargé d'affaires) of the U.S. Embassy to the Republic of China (ROC) stationed in Taipei, Taiwan after the departure of Ambassador Leonard S. Unger in 1979. After diplomatic ties between Taipei and Washington severed, he remained on the island to set up the Taipei Main Office of the American Institute in Taiwan (AIT) at the former compound of U.S. Military Assistance Advisory Group (MAAG). He then served as the AIT's acting Director and deputy director (after the inauguration of Charles T. Cross, first AIT Director in Taipei).

Brown was born in Winchester, Massachusetts and grew up in East Lexington, Massachusetts and graduated from Lexington High School (Massachusetts). He majored in history at Harvard on a Naval Reserve Officers Training Corps scholarship and served as an artillery officer in the United States Marine Corps from 1952 to 1954 and the reserves from 1954 to 1960. He was stationed in Korea after the Korean War from August 1953 for about a year.

References

External links
U.S. State Department Archives (People)
List of U.S. Ambassadors to Thailand 1882 to 2008

1930 births
Living people
Ambassadors of the United States to Israel
Ambassadors of the United States to Thailand
Harvard College alumni
Deputy Directors of the American Institute in Taiwan
Lexington High School alumni
People from Lexington, Massachusetts
United States Marine Corps officers
United States Marine Corps reservists